ROMing is a Czech comedy film, released in 2007. It's a road movie centered on the Roma (Gypsies), but with an extra story within the story.

Cast
 Bolek Polívka - Stano Zaječí
 Marián Labuda - Roman
 Vítezslav Holub - Jura
 Jean Constantin - Somáli
 Corina Moise - Bebetka
 Vladimír Javorský - the postman, the devil, God
 Florentina Emanoil - Somáliová
 Oldřich Vlach - the priest
 Eva Leinweberová - clerk
 Jaromír Nosek - policeman
 Miroslav Hanuš - policeman
 Milan Senki as Mihajli's Son
 Robert Senki as Mihajli's Son
 Jan Surmaj as Mihajli's Son
 Petr Surmaj as Mihajli's Son
 Jan Pulo as Mihajli's Son
 Viliam Conka as Scuka
 Berta Cervenáková as Scuková
 Hana Kovaríková as Verunka
 Emilya Gulyevová as Ivetka
 David Sir as Altar boy
 Jitka Jezková
 Jitka Moučková as Bebetka (voice)
 Jirí Plachý
 Saša Rašilov

External links
 

2007 films
2007 comedy films
Czech comedy road movies
2000s comedy road movies
2000s Czech films